The church of San Vincenzo is a Baroque style, Roman Catholic church located on Corso Canalgrande, number 75 in Modena, Italy.

History
Built on the site of a prior 13th century church, the Theatine order tore down the structure to build a new church.

The layout of the church resembles that of other Theatine churches such as Sant'Andrea della Valle in Rome. With a long nave and a number of side chapels. The architect, sometime after 1634, was Bartolomeo Avanzini. The interior stucco was mainly the work of Avanzini, who was also active in similar decoration at the Palazzo Ducale of Sassuolo.

On May 13, 1944, a bomb destroyed the presbytery and choir, destroying the apse and cupola frescoes (1671) by Sigismondo Caula. The apse, now bare, had a Glory of St Vincent. The main altar, restored after the bombing, was carved by Tommaso Loraghi. A funeral chapel for the Dukes of Este and their family was built in 1836 by Duke Francesco IV using designs by Francesco Vandelli. The first chapel on the left has an altarpiece of St Gregory reading by Guercino.

References

External links
Image of the Church of San Vincenzo (Italian Wikipedia)

Roman Catholic churches completed in 1761
17th-century Roman Catholic church buildings in Italy
Roman Catholic churches in Modena
1634 establishments in Italy
Baroque architecture in Modena